Oenospila kopperi is a moth species in the genus Oenospila. It is found on Sumatra.

References

Hausmann, A. & M. Somerer, 2001: Oenospila kopperi, spec. nov. eine neue grüne Geometride aus Sumatra, Spixiana 24 (3): 241–244.

External links

Hemitheini
Moths described in 2001
Endemic fauna of Indonesia